Sanbao may refer to:

 Chinese for Three Treasures (disambiguation) (三宝), in various cultural and religious meanings
 The title of Zheng He (1371–1433), the eunuch admiral
 Sanpu railway station (三堡站), on the Beijing–Baotou Railway in Beijing
 Sanbao Subdistrict (三宝街道), Beipiao, Liaoning
 Sanbao, Gansu (三堡镇), town in Minle County
 Sanbao, Cenxi (三堡镇), town in Guangxi
 Sanbao, Xuzhou (三堡镇), town in Tongshan District, Xuzhou, Jiangsu
 Sanbao Township, Guangxi (三宝乡), in Tian'e County
 Sanbao Township, Heilongjiang (三宝乡), in Bin County
 Sanbao Township, Jiangsu (三堡乡) in Huai'an District, Huai'an
 Sanbao Township, Liaoning (三宝乡), in Beipiao
 Sanbao Township, Xinjiang (三堡乡) in Turpan